The Kuryokhin Center, or more extended the Sergey Kuryokhin Center for Modern Art, is a non-profit cultural centre in Saint Petersburg, Russia. The centre was founded in 2004 and named after the Russian avant garde composer Sergey Kuryokhin. The main space of the centre has a capacity of 2000 people. The venue is located in an old cinema building.

About Kuryokhin Center
The Kuryokhin Center organises visual art exhibitions, art events and festivals. The Modern Art Center is an old cinema space. It hosts experimental music, film and art festivals (SKIF, Electro-mechanika Festival, Videoforma festival and Ethno-mechanica Festival) and a few other random events several times per year.

SKIF and Electro-Mechanica
The  (SKIF) is an annual international festival of modern music and arts that has taken place since 1998. Kuryokhin's long-time partner cellist Boris Raiskin conceived the festival in New York City. SKIF-1 and SKIF-2 took place in New York in 1997 and 1998. In October 1998 SKIF-3 moved to Saint Petersburg, the city where Kuryokhin lived and worked. 

Electro-Mechanica is an annual festival since 2007 representing electronic audio-visual arts including music, animation, videos, films, installations and performances

See also
Sergey Kuryokhin Contemporary Art Award

Sources and references

 Kuryokhin Center Catalogue

External links
 www.kuryokhin.net

Culture in Saint Petersburg
Entertainment in Saint Petersburg
Music in Saint Petersburg
Art museums and galleries in Russia
2004 establishments in Russia
Buildings and structures in Saint Petersburg
Music venues in Russia
Tourist attractions in Saint Petersburg
Arts centres